Tiquadra nucifraga is a moth of the family Tineidae. It is known from Colombia.

Description 
The forewings are light brownish strewn with coarse dark fuscous transverse strigulae sprinkled blackish. Irregular rather dark fuscous suffusion occupies most of antemedian area and forms large blotches on the costa beyond the middle and posterior halt of the dorsum. There is a small dark fuscous spot near before the apex. The hindwings are rather light fuscous.

References 

Hapsiferinae
Moths of South America
Endemic fauna of Colombia
Moths described in 1919